Cryptochetum is a genus of scale parasite flies in the family Cryptochetidae. There are more than 30 described species in Cryptochetum.

Species
These 35 species belong to the genus Cryptochetum:

C. acuticornutum (Yang & Yang, 1998)
C. aenescens (Meijere, 1916)
C. aspidoprocti Ghesquiere, 1943
C. brachycerum Thorpe, 1941
C. brevicostatum Bruggen, 1960
C. buccatum Hendel, 1933
C. capense Bruggen, 1960
C. chalybeum (Meijere, 1916)
C. curtipenne Knab, 1914
C. euthyiproboscise Xi & Yin, 2020
C. fastidiosum Bezzi, 1920
C. ghanii Steyskal, 1971
C. glochidiatusum Xi & Yin, 2020
C. grandicorne Rondani, 1875
C. iceryae (Williston, 1888) (cottony cushion scale parasite)
C. idiocerum Thorpe, 1941
C. jorgepastori (Cadahia, 1984)
C. latimanum Malloch, 1927
C. longilingum Xi & Yin, 2020
C. medianum (Yang & Yang, 1998)
C. melan Ghesquiere, 1943
C. mineuri Séguy, 1953
C. mixtum Bruggen, 1960
C. monophlebi (Skuse, 1889)
C. nipponense (Tokunaga, 1943)
C. nonagintaseptem Yang & Yang, 1998
C. oocerum Thorpe, 1941
C. pariceryae Thorpe, 1941
C. shaanxiense Xi & Yang, 2015
C. smaragdinum Séguy, 1948
C. striatum Thorpe, 1941
C. tianmuense Yang & Yang, 2001
C. tuberculatum Thorpe, 1941
C. turanicum Nartshuk, 1979
C. utile Bruggen, 1960
C. vayssierei Ghesquière, 1950
C. yunnanum Xi & Yang, 2015
C. zalatilabium Xi & Yang, 2015

References

Further reading

 

Cryptochetidae
Articles created by Qbugbot
Taxa named by Camillo Rondani